Mañón, also registered in the past as Maañón , is a municipality in north-western Spain in the province of A Coruña, in the autonomous community of Galicia. It belongs to the comarca of Ortegal. Ferrolterra's population represents the third largest concentration of people in Galicia, and its disperse population exceeds 211,000 (2005).

"O Barqueiro" and "Estaca de Bares" Ports 
 Fishing port
 Sport port

Geography, history and general information 

Mañón belongs to the Ferrolterra region of Ortegal and it is made up by five parishes, with 2,032 inhabitants, who are disseminated over its 82.1 km².

This council forms a narrow and long band of land that joins mountain, river and sea. The fertile freshwater of the river Sor ploughs its rugged lands from south to north. 

The mountainous alignments of the Serra da Faladoira and Serra da Coriscada, the valleys of the Sor river and its estuary, and the peninsula that forms Estaca de Bares offers a very attractive landscape and of exceptional natural value.

At monumental level, they emphasize the prehistoric rest like mámoas of Estaca de Bares and the possibly prehistoric (built in the Middle Ages according to other sources) port;  in addition to Roman necropolis in A Ponte do Porto.

Some of its parochial churches are worthy of mention considering its rusticity and integration to the surroundings.

Mañón has a very particular geographical structure and the river Sor ploughs deep valleys with plenty of vegetation, which contrasts with the leafy high areas of the mountain range. The serpent shapes drawn by the Sor and its tributaries along their courses form a succession of inserted meanders, which form valleys with a lot of vegetation, where we can see rapid and beautiful waterfalls.
The weather is wet oceanic and the mild winters are followed by fresh summers. The rainfall is particularly abundant, but due to the relief, there are local microweathers, as happens in the banks of the river Sor, where the vegetation is partially responsible for the weather changes.
These physical and weather conditions, as well as its privileged situation between two seas, made Estaca de Bares to be declared 'natural area of national interest', and more recently, a protected area.

Parishes
Bares, As Grañas (do Sor), Mañón, Mogor, As Ribeiras (do Sor)

Miscellaneous data 
Inhabitants: 2,032 (2003)
Extension: 82 km²

See also 
 Ortegal comarca, north-western Spain.

References

External links 
  Site devoted to the art of landscape and nature of Ferrolterra
  Ferrol-San Cibrao Port Authority
  Web-site dedicated to the history of Mañón and Estaca de Bares|

Municipalities in the Province of A Coruña